Separadi (also, Separady) is a village and municipality in the Yardymli Rayon of Azerbaijan. It has a population of 750. The municipality consists of the villages of Separadi and Teşkan.

References 

Populated places in Yardimli District